Jonathan Clarke (born 18 December 1984 in Melbourne) is an Australian cyclist, who currently rides for UCI Continental team . He turned professional in 2006.

Major results

2004
 2nd Melbourne to Warrnambool Classic
2005
 7th Overall Tour of Wellington
2006
 3rd Road race, National Under-23 Road Championships
 8th Clásica Memorial Txuma
2007
 6th Overall Bay Classic Series
1st Stage 1
2015
 9th Winston-Salem Cycling Classic
2016
 6th Overall Herald Sun Tour
 10th Overall Tour of the Gila
2017
 4th Overall Sibiu Cycling Tour
 7th Overall Tour of Utah
2018
 2nd Overall Tour de Taiwan
2019
 1st  Overall Tour de Taiwan
1st Stage 2
2021
 7th Overall Tour de Serbie
2022
 1st Stage 1 Joe Martin Stage Race

References

External links

1984 births
Living people
Sportsmen from Victoria (Australia)
Cyclists from Melbourne